David Berry (born 1 June 1945 in Newton-le-Willows) is an English former footballer.

Berry began his playing career with Blackpool but moved to Chester in July 1964 having not made any league appearances for the Seasiders. His first season at Chester yielded just one first-team outing against Wrexham in the Welsh Cup, and he had to wait until 18 March 1967 for his only appearance in The Football League. He came on a substitute for Elfed Morris during Chester's 1–0 loss at Luton Town.

Berry later dropped into Non-League football with Macclesfield Town.

Bibliography

References

1945 births
Living people
English Football League players
English footballers
Association football defenders
People from Newton-le-Willows
Blackpool F.C. players
Chester City F.C. players
Macclesfield Town F.C. players